Venkatesan Devarajan (born 22 July 1973) is an Indian boxer and Olympian. He won the bronze medal in the 1994 World Boxing Championship in Bangkok. He was the second Indian to win a medal at the Boxing World Cup after Pu Zoramthanga (boxer), from Mizoram. He is from Chennai, India. He was awarded the Arjuna Award in 1995. He competed in the men's bantamweight event at the 1992 Summer Olympics.

V. Devarajan has been a fighter on and off the boxing ring. He broke new ground by becoming the first Indian to win a World Cup medal on foreign soil in 1994. Deva valiantly fought for his rights until recently with his employers, Southern Railway, after being "denied a due promotion."  That his prolonged battle with Railways didn't have a happy ending is another matter. Fighting well is the credo of sportsmen and Deva has given his all in his bouts against his opponents and employers.

Boxing is a family sport for Deva. Inspired by his father Venkatesan's unflinching support, Deva scaled heights which only few Indian boxers have had achieved before Vijender Singh. His brothers, Harikrishnan and Baskaran, also achieved prominence in boxing. When Deva won a bronze medal in the featherweight category at the 1994 World Cup in Bangkok, what struck many was his baby-face. It was radically different from the face of a boxer. It had a rare innocence. Deva was only 20 years old that time. But he had maturity beyond his age. Upon his arrival in New Delhi from Bangkok, Deva spoke like a real champion. "I was eager to perform. There was no point in saying that I too took part in the World Championship, the Olympics and the World Cup without having done anything worth remembering," he had said. A win over Thailand's Kamsing Somluck in front of a baying home crowd was the highlight of Deva's memorable Cup performance. At the peak of his career, the Chennai boxer, who was adjudged the best of Indian Railways in 1995, had beaten top stars from almost all the big boxing nations. One of his scalps, Mongolian Lkhagva Dugarbaaatar, went on to become a professional champion in 1999. Only an unfortunate first-round pairing with a Cuban champion spoiled his Olympic hopes in Barcelona 1992. Deva had chances to qualify for the next Olympics but his heart was after professional boxing at that time. Sports administrators keep a distance from the stars of their disciplines in this country, but the late IABF president Aspy Adajania made his liking for Deva public. Adajania always held the boxer in high esteem. He even had Deva as his personal guest in Bombay after the Chennai star's Bangkok success.

Deva's heart beats for sports in general and boxing in particular. When a newspaper published an article a couple of years ago that the Tamil Nadu government had been delaying cash incentives for state sports achievers, the Olympian was the first to react. He poured his heart out against the inordinate delay. "A help in need is a help indeed," he had said at that time. From his personal experience, Deva knew the importance of timely help. That is why he was ready to stick his neck out and seek immediate government action. When the TN government moved to right the wrong, the Olympian was overjoyed. He felt so happy as if he was one among the beneficiaries. Deva hasn't forgotten the odds he had overcome to become a world-class pugilist. Taking boxing away from Deva's system will mean sucking the life out of the man. The plight of young boxers continues to strike a chord with him. Rain or shine Deva is out there at the Nehru Stadium every evening to train youngsters who would otherwise be struggling to learn the lessons of boxing. The big-hearted Arjuna awardee doesn't charge a penny from his charges. He knows well that boxing is a working-class sport. More importantly, Deva is not out there to make money. His love for boxing is deep. He gives his all for its promotion. From talking up his trainee G. Senthilnathan to rejoicing at Vijender Singh's success at the 2008 Olympics and the 2009 World Championship, Deva's passion for the punching game shines through. The tech-savvy boxing coach was among the Arjuna award selectors in 2009. He floats like a butter fly in the ring. This is a fact, but does he sting like a bee? All those who have watched Venkatesan Devarajan in national and international level competitions will unanimously say 'No'. Hard punching has never been Devarajan's cup of tea who wants it anyway as the computer scoring has revolutionized the amateur boxing on such a scale knock out punchers are no longer needed to win b outs these days.

The unassuming lanky boy from a middle-class family has been a phenomenal success in Indian amateur boxing history from a club level pugilist he has risen to the level of qualifying for the Olympics and winning the world cup Bronze medal at Bangkok at 1994. It is not that he has been the first boxer from Tamil Nadu to bring glory to the country. The state has been in the vanguard of producing out standing men with ring craft from the British days.

Even if one ignores the professional part of the state boxing which has more shady side out of it there has been a strong tradition from this piece of land Olympian Munusamy Venu, Amalraj, Xavier and many more on the Asian level have taken this country to greater glory from the 70s. Of course most of them went through the services. However, Devarajan's route to the success has been different. He did not have to be the services pugilist to achieve laurels in a short span of five years. Even in the early days of his boxing career he had class. He held the attention of the spectators with his beautiful foot work. But his punching was eratile. He was hurling more wild ones. Of course he was physically not strong because of his pencil thin body. Later it was the railway coach Devan who had to put him through weight training to strengthen his arms for punches.

Before joining the railways, he gave Tamil Nadu its first gold medal in the national championship in 40 years. Since then he has been winning the gold medal at National championships almost every time. His career took an upswing from 1991 onwards. He was the lone boxer to win the gold medal in Asian qualifying round for the Barcelona Olympic. He was one of the five Indian pugilists who qualified for the games in 1992. He was so good during his training in Cuba and at the Asian level competitions that the then IABF president late Aspy Adajanin expected that if at all there was a medal for India in the Olympics in boxing, it could be from Devarajan. He aired this view to media also.

Unfortunately, Devarajan ran into a Cuban in the very first round and last round points but two years later he had a commanders success in the world cup he faced tougher opponents. Coach Devan attributes this success to the Cuban Blas Fermandezs who did wonders for Devarajan in his three years coaching stint. What ever may be the Cubans qualities he has made Devarajan a very sharp puncher, cutting down all his erratic swing, set the railway coach may be this is the reason for his phenomenal success. When he won the world cup bronze medal in feather weight, Adajania, who was so elated, took him to Bombay as his personal guest for a couple days. Devarajan gets emotional even today, for it had been an unforgettable experience for him. Devarajan has certainly showed the Indian pugilist that world level medals are not beyond their reach. This itself is a great achievement for this Tamil Nadu boxer who has had his fathers strong backing form the beginning.

Deva indeed deserves bigger honours. He was also adjudged the "Best of Indian Railways" in 1995.

References

External links
 

Indian male boxers
Living people
1973 births
Boxers at the 1994 Asian Games
Tamil sportspeople
Martial artists from Chennai
Boxers from Tamil Nadu
Asian Games competitors for India
Olympic boxers of India
Boxers at the 1992 Summer Olympics
Commonwealth Games competitors for India
Boxers at the 1994 Commonwealth Games
Bantamweight boxers
Recipients of the Arjuna Award